WKAA (99.5 FM) better known as "99.5 Kix Country" is a radio station broadcasting a country music format. Licensed to Willacoochee, Georgia, United States, the station serves the Valdosta, Georgia area.  The station is currently owned by Black Crow Media.

History
The station went on the air as WDMG-FM on March 6, 1978.  On September 10, 2004, the station changed its call sign to the current WKAA.

References

External links

KAA
Radio stations established in 1978
1978 establishments in Georgia (U.S. state)